Biopolitics refers to the Humanitarian values that deal with the political relations between the administration or regulation of the life of species and a locality's populations, where politics and law can re-evaluate life based on constants and traits existing in the Natural [phenomenological] world. French philosopher Michel Foucault, who wrote about and gave lectures dedicated to his theory of biopolitics, wrote that it is "to ensure, sustain, and multiply life, to put this life in order."

Notions of biopolitics 
Previous notions of the concept can be traced back to the Middle Ages in John of Salisbury's work Policraticus, in which the term body politic was coined and used. The term biopolitics was first used by Rudolf Kjellén, a political scientist who also coined the term geopolitics, in his 1905 two-volume work The Great Powers. Kjellén used the term in the context of his aim to study "the civil war between social groups" (comprising the state) from a biological perspective, and thus named his putative discipline "biopolitics". In Kjellén's organicist view, the state was a quasi-biological organism, a "super-individual creature." The Nazis also subsequently used the term in the context of their racial policy, with Hans Reiter using it in a 1934 speech to refer to their concept of nation and state based on racial supremacy.

In contemporary US political science studies, usage of the term is mostly divided between a poststructuralist group using the meaning assigned by Foucault (denoting social and political power over life) and another group that uses it to denote studies relating biology and political science. In the work of Foucault, biopolitics refers to the style of government that regulates populations through "biopower" (the application and impact of political power on all aspects of human life).

Morley Roberts, in his 1938 book Bio-politics argued that a correct model for world politics is "a loose association of cell and protozoa colonies". Robert E. Kuttner used the term to refer to his particular brand of "scientific racism," as he called it, which he worked out with noted Eustace Mullins, with whom Kuttner co-founded the Institute for Biopolitics in the late 1950s, and also with Glayde Whitney, a behavioral geneticist. Most of his adversaries designate his model as antisemitic. Kuttner and Mullins were inspired by Morley Roberts, who was in turn inspired by Arthur Keith, or both were inspired by each other and either co-wrote together (or with the Institute of Biopolitics) Biopolitics of Organic Materialism dedicated to Roberts and reprinted some of his works.

In the work of Michael Hardt and Antonio Negri, biopolitics is framed in terms of anti-capitalist insurrection using life and the body as weapons; examples include flight from power and, "in its most tragic and revolting form", suicide terrorism, conceptualized as the opposite of biopower, which is seen as the practice of sovereignty in biopolitical conditions.

According to Professor Agni Vlavianos Arvanitis, biopolitics is a conceptual and operative framework for societal development, promoting bios (Greek for "life") as the central theme in every human endeavor, be it policy, education, art, government, science or technology. This concept uses bios as a term referring to all forms of life on our planet, including their genetic and geographic variation.

Other definitions 

 A political spectrum that reflects positions towards the sociopolitical consequences of the biotech revolution.
 Political advocacy in support of, or in opposition to, some applications of biotechnology.
Public policies regarding some applications of biotechnology.
 Political advocacy concerned with the welfare of all forms of life and how they are moved by one another.
 The politics of bioregionalism.
 The interplay and interdisciplinary studies relating biology and political science, primarily the study of the relationship between biology and political behavior. Most of these works agree on three fundamental aspects. First, the object of investigation is primarily political behavior, which—and this is the underlying assumption—is caused in a substantial way by objectively demonstrable biological factors. For example, the relationship of biology and political orientation, but also biological correlates of partisanship and voting behavior. (See also sociobiology.)

In the colonial setting 

Biopolitics, read as a variation of Foucault's Biopower, has proven to be a substantive concept in the field of postcolonial studies. Foucault's term refers to the intersection between power (political, economic, judicial etc.) and the individual's bodily autonomy. According to postcolonial theorists, present within the colonial setting are various mechanisms of power that consolidate the political authority of the colonizer; Biopolitics is thus the means by which a colonising force utilises political power to regulate and control the bodily autonomy of the colonized subject, who are oppressed and subaltern. Edward Said, in his work Orientalism, analysed the means by which colonial powers rationalised their relationship with the colonized societies they inhabited through discursive means, and how these discourses continue to influence modern-day depictions of the Orient. Franz Fanon applied a psychoanalytic frame to his theories of subjectivity, arguing that the subjectivity of the colonized is in constant dialogue with the oppressive political power of the colonizer, a mirroring of the Oedipal father-son dynamic. While not using the term himself, Fanon's work has been cited as a major development in the conceptualisation of biopolitics in the colonial setting.

Catastrophes are periodically mobilized as vehicles for historical transformation. European states often found themselves grappling with the sociobiological propensities of their populations. Mercantilism and capitalist modes of production led to a modern biopolitical approach to famine: the modern state depended on providing a diet sufficient to keep the biological machines of industrial capitalism running. The British developed biopolitics in tandem with colonization to help solidify their control over the Irish.

The French Third Republic in Western Africa also employed biopolitics in their colonial efforts. The fin-de-siecle revolution in microbiology and specific developments in public health legislation aided the French. Furthermore, thanks to the germ theory of disease pioneered by Robert Koch and Louis Pasteur, the aetiology of some of the most deadly diseases—cholera and typhoid—began to be understood in the 1890s, and the French used this new scientific knowledge in the tropics of West Africa. Illnesses like the bubonic plague were isolated, and vectors of malaria and yellow fever were identified for the political purpose of public health. They passed public health laws to introduce up-to-date health standards. The goal was for African subjects to respond in exactly the same way as metropolitan citizens to market incentives and new technologies imposed by a progressive state. Thus, public health was a political concern in the sense that the state hoped citizens would be more productive if they lived longer. Another example in this regard is another French colony: Lebanon. According to Maya Mikdashi, sex and sect are also to be considered as biopolitical categories since they are "defined at birth and categorized, quantified, and managed through state law and institutions at the level of the individual (citizen, noncitizen) and at the level of populations (sexes, sects, citizenry). One is not a cypher of the other. Sex is not an analytic frame to unlock or understand sect or vice versa. Instead, sect and sex are mutually constitutive modes of political difference. The “state effect,” and indeed Lebanese sovereignty itself, emerges from the management of these modes of political difference. The intractability of sex and sect manifests in law, legal practice, and in the regulation of citizenship and noncitizenship as multiple modalities of structural difference”. In case of Lebanon, with its ethnic diversity, sectarianism is still a fact whereby even exposure to other sects will not per se make sectarianism vanish. In other words, according to Lara Deeb, “society is not essentially sectarian but has been constructed as such through political and institutional structures over time, the interpersonal continues to matter. Dismantling structures of oppression does not necessarily lead to the disappearance of social discriminations or biases”. Hence, what we can notice in all of these examples is that “The modern state, through biopolitical, governmental, and necropolitical technologies of power, produces, quantifies, and regulates individuals
and groups with individuating and totalizing identifiers: region, gender, name, sect, sex, religion, age, race, refugee, and citizenship. A citizen’s sect, class, region/municipality, and gender together structure and
contingently frame each practice of citizenship. Biopolitical power, after all, is not something that discrete subjects, or groups of subjects, are formed through or subjected to. Rather, biopolitical power functions at the interrelated national, transnational, and international scales. It works through abstraction, massification, and modulation across a given population”.

Michel Foucault

French philosopher and social theorist Michel Foucault first discussed his thoughts on biopolitics in his lecture series "Society Must Be Defended" given at the Collège de France from 1975 to 1976.  Foucault's concept of biopolitics is largely derived from his own notion of biopower, and the extension of state power over both the physical and political bodies of a population.  While only mentioned briefly in his "Society Must Be Defended" lectures, the conceptualisation of biopolitics developed by Foucault has become prominent in social science and the humanities.

Foucault described biopolitics as "a new technology of power...[that] exists at a different level, on a different scale, and [that] has a different bearing area, and makes use of very different instruments."  More than a disciplinary mechanism, Foucault's biopolitics acts as a control apparatus exerted over a population as a whole or, as Foucault stated, "a global mass." In the years that followed, Foucault continued to develop his notions of the biopolitical in his "The Birth of Biopolitics" and "The Courage of Truth" lectures.

Foucault gave numerous examples of biopolitical control when he first mentioned the concept in 1976.  These examples include "ratio of births to deaths, the rate of reproduction, the fertility of a population, and so on." He contrasted this method of social control with political power in the Middle Ages. Whereas in the Middle Ages pandemics made death a permanent and perpetual part of life, this was then shifted around the end of the 18th century with the introduction of milieu into the biological sciences. Foucault then gives different contrasts to the then physical sciences in which the industrialisation of the population was coming to the fore through the concept of work, where Foucault then argues power starts to become a target for this milieu by the 17th century. The development of vaccines and medicines dealing with public hygiene allowed death to be held (and/or withheld) from certain populations.  This was the introduction of "more subtle, more rational mechanisms: insurance, individual and collective savings, safety measures, and so on."

Notes

Further reading
 Research in Biopolitics: Volume 1: Sexual Politics and Political Feminism Editor Albert Somit (1991)
 Research in Biopolitics: Volume 2: Biopolitics and the Mainstream: Contributions of Biology to Political Science Editor Albert Somit (1994)
 Research in Biopolitics: Volume 3: Human Nature and Politics Editors Steven A. Peterson Albert Somit (1995)
 Research in Biopolitics: Volume 4: Research in Biopolitics Editors Albert Somit Steven A. Peterson (1996)
 Research in Biopolitics: Volume 5: Recent Explorations in Biology and Politics Editors Albert Somit Steven A. Peterson (1997)
 Research In Biopolitics: Volume 6: Sociobiology and Politics Editors Albert Somit Steven A. Peterson (1998)
 Research In Biopolitics: Volume 7: Ethnic Conflicts Explained By Ethnic Nepotism Editors Albert Somit Steven A. Peterson (1999)
 Research In Biopolitics: Volume 8: Evolutionary Approaches In The Behavioral Sciences: Toward A Better Understanding of Human Nature Editors Steven A. Peterson Albert Somit (2001)
 Research In Biopolitics: Volume 9: Biology and Political Behavior: The Brain, Genes and Politics - the Cutting Edge; Editor Albert Somit (2011)

External links
 Steinmann, Kate. (2011). Apparatus, Capture, Trace: Photography and Biopolitics in: Fillip. Fall 2011.
 Verde Garrido, Miguelángel. (2015). Contesting a biopolitics of information and communications: The importance of truth and sousveillance after Snowden in: Surveillance & Society (volume 13, number 2; pages 153–167).

 
Bioethics
Michel Foucault
Power (social and political) concepts

de:Biopolitik